The Karl Schäfer Memorial (other titles: Asko Cup (1987), Vienna Cup (1994), or Vienna Trophy) was a senior-level international figure skating competition held in Vienna, Austria. Medals were awarded in four disciplines: men's singles, ladies' singles, pair skating, and ice dancing.

Named after Karl Schäfer, who died in April 1976, the competition was held annually, usually in the autumn, from 1974 through 2008. It formed the Donaupokal along with the Penta Cup International (also known as Novarat Trophy), an event in Budapest. The Karl Schäfer Memorial served as an Olympic qualifying competition in 1997 and 2005. It was last held in 2008.

Medalists

Men

Ladies

Pairs

Ice dancing

References

External links
 Competitive history: Nicole Bobek
 Competitive history: Michael Chack
 Competitive history: Maria Butyrskaya
 Competitive history: Rudy Galindo
 Competitive history: Ilia Kulik
 1996 pairs results

 
Figure skating competitions
Figure skating in Austria